Xpress is a regional commuter coach service operated as a partnership between the Georgia Regional Transportation Authority (GRTA) and Clayton, Cherokee, Cobb, DeKalb, Douglas, Forsyth, Fulton, Gwinnett, Henry, Paulding, and Rockdale counties. As of 2015, 34 Xpress routes are in operation. Operators of Xpress are contracted through Professional Transit Management and American Coach. In Cobb and Gwinnett Counties Cobb Community Transit or Gwinnett County Transit provide Xpress service in addition to their own express services. Service hours are from roughly 5:30 a.m. to 9:30 pm weekdays, with most service being rush hours only.

Routes 

400 Cumming to North Springs MARTA/Downtown Atlanta
408 Doraville MARTA to Johns Creek*
410 Sugarloaf Mills to Lindbergh MARTA*
411 Hamilton Mill/Mall of Georgia to Midtown Atlanta****
412 Sugarloaf Mills to Midtown Atlanta*
413 Hamilton Mill to Downtown Atlanta****
416 Dacula to Downtown Atlanta****
417 Sugarloaf Mills to Perimeter Center
418 Snellville to Downtown Atlanta*
420 West Conyers to Downtown Atlanta
421 West Conyers to Midtown Atlanta
422 Panola Road to Downtown Atlanta
423 East Conyers/Panola Road to Midtown Atlanta
424 Stone Mountain to Downtown Atlanta
425 East Conyers to Downtown Atlanta
428 Panola Road to Perimeter Center
430 McDonough to Downtown/Midtown Atlanta
431 Stockbridge to Midtown Atlanta
432 Stockbridge to Downtown Atlanta
440 Tara Boulevard (Atlanta Motor Speedway, Clayton County Justice Center) to Downtown Atlanta
441 Clayton County Justice Center to Midtown Atlanta
442 Riverdale to Downtown Atlanta
450 Newnan to Downtown Atlanta
451 Newnan to Midtown Atlanta
455 Union City to Downtown Atlanta
460 Douglasville to Downtown Atlanta
461 Douglasville to Midtown Atlanta
462 West Douglasville to Downtown Atlanta
476 Hiram/Powder Springs to Midtown and Downtown Atlanta**
480 Acworth to Downtown Atlanta**
481 Town Center to Midtown Atlanta**
490 Canton to Downtown Atlanta***
491 Woodstock, Georgia to Midtown Atlanta***

* Route is operated by, and as a part of, Gwinnett County Transit
** Route is operated by, and as a part of, Cobb Community Transit
*** Route is operated by, and as a part of, Cherokee Area Transportation System (CATS)
**** Route is operated by American Coach

Future plans 

Originally at full system implementation, Xpress had planned to operate 27 routes traversing 12 metro area counties. However, due to the popularity of its bus service (overcrowding on routes has become commonplace) the agency has already reached this goal. A second expansion phase is now being implemented to have 47 routes in operation by the 2013 fiscal year. These routes will connect the outlying suburbs with each other and downtown Atlanta. Though most routes go to downtown Atlanta, some routes terminate or make stops at MARTA train stations along the route.

External links 
GRTA website
Xpress website
MARTA website
CCT website
GCT website
CATS website

Bus transportation in Georgia (U.S. state)
Transportation Regional